Sandyville is an unincorporated community in north central Jackson County, West Virginia, United States.  It lies close to the left fork of Sandy Creek, nestled in the hills between Ravenswood and Ripley. It has a population of 1,721 and an average household income of $41,122.

The community was named after nearby Sandy Creek.

Climate
The climate in this area is characterized by hot, humid summers and generally mild to cool winters.  According to the Köppen Climate Classification system, Sandyville has a humid subtropical climate, abbreviated "Cfa" on climate maps.

References

Unincorporated communities in West Virginia
Unincorporated communities in Jackson County, West Virginia